Jim McManus and Jim Osborne were the defending champions, but did not participate this year.

Tom Okker and Marty Riessen won the men's doubles title at the 1973 Queen's Club Championships tennis tournament, defeating Ray Keldie and Raymond Moore 6–4, 7–5 in the final.

Draw

Finals

Top half

Bottom half

External links
 Draw

1973 Queen's Club Championships